Treacle protein is a protein that in humans is encoded by the TCOF1 gene.

This gene encodes a nucleolar protein with an LIS1 homology domain. The protein is involved in ribosomal DNA gene transcription through its interaction with upstream binding factor (UBF). Mutations in this gene have been associated with Treacher Collins syndrome, a disorder which includes abnormal craniofacial development. Alternate transcriptional splice variants encoding different isoforms have been found for this gene, but only three of them have been characterized to date.

TCOF1 is a gene that provides instructions for making a protein called treacle.  This protein is active during early embryonic development in structures that become bones and other tissues in the face. Although the precise function of this protein is unknown, researchers believe that it plays a critical role in the development of facial bones and related structures.

Studies suggest that treacle is involved in the production of a molecule called ribosomal RNA (rRNA) within cells. Treacle is active in the nucleolus, which is a small region inside the nucleus where rRNA is produced. As a major component of cell structures called ribosomes, rRNA is essential for the assembly of proteins.

Aside from its interaction with UBF, treacle has been implicated in the methylation of the precursor to mature ribosomal RNA by interaction with the nucleolar protein pNop56.

The TCOF1 gene is located on the long (q) arm of chromosome 5 between positions 32 and 33.1, from base pair 149,717,427 to base pair 149,760,047.

Related diseases
More than 120 mutations in the TCOF gene have been identified in people with Treacher Collins syndrome. Most of these mutations insert or delete a small number of DNA building blocks (base pairs) in the TCOF1 gene. TCOF1 mutations lead to the production of an abnormally small, nonfunctional version of treacle or prevent the cell from producing this protein. Researchers speculate that a loss of treacle reduces the production of rRNA in parts of the embryo that develop into facial bones and tissues. It is not known how loss of the treacle protein causes the specific problems with facial development found in Treacher Collins syndrome. For instance, mutations in the TCOF gene of these individuals often result in a cleft palate.

Model organisms
Mutations in this gene in Jindo dogs have been associated to the observed cranial differences between Jindo and boxer dogs.

References

Further reading

External links 
  GeneReviews/NCBI/NIH/UW entry on Treacher Collins Syndrome or Mandibulofacial Dysostosis
 GeneCard